"Hard Rock Bottom of Your Heart" is a song written by Hugh Prestwood, and recorded by American country music singer Randy Travis.  It was released in January 1990 as the second single from the album No Holdin' Back.  "Hard Rock Bottom of Your Heart" features a rare and very distinct rhythm harmonica beat in the final 40 seconds of the song.

Chart history
In March 1990, the song spent four weeks at No. 1 on the Billboard magazine Hot Country Singles & Tracks chart. In doing so, it became the first song to stay as long atop the chart in 12 years; the last to accomplish the feat was the 1978 song, "Mamas Don't Let Your Babies Grow Up to Be Cowboys" by Waylon Jennings and Willie Nelson.

Year-end charts

References

Whitburn, Joel, "Top Country Songs: 1944-2005," 2006.

1990 singles
Randy Travis songs
RPM Country Tracks number-one singles of the year
Songs written by Hugh Prestwood
Song recordings produced by Kyle Lehning
Warner Records Nashville singles
1989 songs